The 2012 Kerala Sahitya Akademi Award was announced on 11 July 2013. The Akademi fellowships and the awards for overall controbution were announced in October 2013.

Winners

Endowments
I. C. Chacko Award: V. K. Hariharanunnithan (Malayala Chinthakal)
C. B. Kumar Award: M. Mukundan (Adhunikatha Innevide?)
K.R. Namboodiri Award: V. S. Warrier (Sree Buddhan: Jeevitham Darsanam Matham)
Kuttipuzha Award: K. E. N. Kunjahammed (Samooham, Sahityam, Samskaram)
Kanakasree Award: Prakasan Madikkai (Moonnu Kallukalkkidayil)
Geetha Hiranyan Award: G.R. Indugopan (Rathriyil Autoyil Oru Manushyan)
G. N. Pillai Award: N. P. Sajeesh (Drisya Desangalude Bhoopadam)

Fellowships
 M. P. Veerendra Kumar
 Paul Zacharia

References

Kerala Sahitya Akademi Awards
Kerala Sahitya Akademi Awards